Events from the year 2007 in the European Union.

Incumbents
Commission President – José Manuel Barroso, People's Party
Council Presidency – Germany (January–June) and Portugal (July–December)
Parliament President – Josep Borrell, Socialists (to 16 January). Hans-Gert Pöttering, People's Party
High Representative – Javier Solana, Socialists

Events
 1 January – Bulgaria and Romania join the European Union.
 1 January – Slovenia adopts the Euro as its official currency, replacing the tolar.
 1 January – Irish becomes the 23rd official language of the EU.
 1 January – Germany takes over the EU Presidency.
 9 January – far right MEPs form a political group called Identity, Tradition and Sovereignty.
 25 March – Berlin Declaration signed to mark the 50th anniversary of the Treaty of Rome.
 1 June – The REACH directive, described as "most important piece of EU legislation for 20 years", comes into force.
 23 June – EU leaders agree to a Reform Treaty (later named Treaty of Lisbon) to replace the Treaty establishing a Constitution for Europe rejected by Dutch and French voters in referendums.
 1 July – Portugal takes over the Presidency from Germany.
 23 July – Intergovernmental Conference on the Treaty of Lisbon starts.
 13 December 2007 – Signing of the Treaty of Lisbon
 21 December – Czech Republic, Estonia, Hungary, Latvia, Lithuania, Malta, Poland, Slovakia and Slovenia implement the Schengen Agreement for overland borders and seaports.

References

External links
 Video: What has Europe done for you in 2007?

 
Years of the 21st century in the European Union
2000s in the European Union